Anthony Nelson Herschel Hill (1939 – 22 July 2016) was an English musician, composer, and professor of music. During his lifetime, Herschel Hill composed some 24 symphonies and 14 concertos.

Early life and education
Anthony Nelson Herschel Hill was born in 1939 in Shrewsbury, England, to the eminent psychiatrist Sir Denis Hill. He is a descendant of the astronomer and composer Sir William Herschel.

Herschel Hill studied at the Royal College of Music as a pianist, organist, and composer, for which he won several of the major prizes. While there, he studied with the musician composers Herbert Howells, Richard Latham, and Cyril Smith. After further study in Paris with French musician Nadia Boulanger and tutoring with Hungarian musician Louis Kentner, he began his career as a musician and teacher.

Career
Herschel Hill has composed for piano, organ, and choir. He has played concertos with the London Philharmonic Orchestra and the Philharmonia. He has also performed a number of solo recitals across the United Kingdom, France, Singapore, and New Zealand. As a composer, several of his pieces have appeared on the Associated Board of the Royal Schools of Music (ABRSM) exam lists and on BBC Radio 3.

In 1982, Herschel Hill published two albums with the classical sheet music publisher Stainer & Bell: Four pieces for cello and piano and Two pieces for viola and piano. He wrote an additional album for them – O ye that love the Lord : trebles and organ – in 1986. That same year, he wrote two albums for the publisher Fraser-Enoch: Soliloquy for piano and Contrasts for piano.

He was a teacher of music at Bishop's Stortford College in Hertfordshire. By 1986, he was director of music at St Simon Zelotes Church in London, a position he held for more than a quarter of a century.

Herschel Hill has writen a number of liturgical works. He wrote Ave Verum Corpus in 1990 for Prebendary John Pearce and the choir of St Simon Zelotes Church.

Personal life
In 1964, Herschel Hill married Joan Havill, a New Zealand pianist, with whom he had studied at the Royal College of Music, in Kensington, London.

Death
Herschel Hill died on 22 July 2016 in the City of London. His funeral was held on 10 August at St Marylebone Crematorium in East Finchley, London. Following his death, Radio Times wrote that his "true worth" was "yet to be fully appreciated."

Discography

References

1939 births
2016 deaths
Havill family
People from Shrewsbury
English classical pianists
English classical organists
20th-century English composers
21st-century English composers
English Christian hymnwriters
Alumni of the Royal College of Music
Academics of the Royal College of Music